Prosačov is a village and municipality in Vranov nad Topľou District in the Prešov Region of eastern Slovakia.

History
In historical records the village was first mentioned in 1363.

Geography
The municipality lies at an altitude of 190 metres and covers an area of 4.280 km². It has a population of about 201 people.

External links
 
http://www.statistics.sk/mosmis/eng/run.html

Villages and municipalities in Vranov nad Topľou District
Šariš